The Yeysky otdel was a Cossack district (otdel) of the Kuban oblast of the Caucasus Viceroyalty of the Russian Empire. It bordered the Don Host Oblast to the north, the Black Sea to the west, the Kavkazsky otdel to the south, and the Stavropol Governorate to the east. The area of the Yeysky otdel included most of the contemporary Krasnodar Krai region of Russia. The administrative capital was the city of Umanskaya (present-day Leningradskaya).

Administrative divisions 
The subcounties (uchastoks) of the Yeysky otdel in 1912 were as follows:

Demographics

Russian Empire Census 
The majority of the population indicated Ukrainian to be their mother tongue, with a significant Russian speaking minority.

Kavkazskiy kalendar 

Notes

References

Bibliography 

Otdels of Kuban Oblast
Kuban Oblast
Caucasus Viceroyalty (1801–1917)
History of Kuban